Tetramethylsilane (abbreviated as TMS) is the organosilicon compound with the formula Si(CH3)4. It is the simplest tetraorganosilane. Like all silanes, the TMS framework is tetrahedral. TMS is a building block in organometallic chemistry but also finds use in diverse niche applications.

Synthesis and reactions 

TMS is a by-product of the production of methyl chlorosilanes, SiClx(CH3)4−x, via the direct process of reacting methyl chloride with silicon. The more useful products of this reaction are those for x = 1 (trimethylsilyl chloride), 2 (dimethyldichlorosilane), and 3 (methyltrichlorosilane).

TMS undergoes deprotonation upon treatment with butyllithium to give (H3C)3SiCH2Li. The latter, trimethylsilylmethyl lithium, is a relatively common alkylating agent.

In chemical vapor deposition, TMS is the precursor to silicon dioxide or silicon carbide, depending on the deposition conditions.  In the formation of silicon carbide, carbosilanes, such as 1,3,5,7-tetramethyl-1,3,5,7-tetrasilaadamantane, are observed as intermediates.

Uses in NMR spectroscopy 

Tetramethylsilane is the accepted internal standard for calibrating chemical shift for 1H, 13C and 29Si NMR spectroscopy in organic solvents (where TMS is soluble). In water, where it is not soluble, sodium salts of DSS, 2,2-dimethyl-2-silapentane-5-sulfonate, are used instead. Because of its high volatility, TMS can easily be evaporated, which is convenient for recovery of samples analyzed by NMR spectroscopy.

Because all twelve hydrogen atoms in a tetramethylsilane molecule are equivalent, its 1H NMR spectrum consists of a singlet.
The chemical shift of this singlet is assigned as δ 0, and all other chemical shifts are determined relative to it. The majority of compounds studied by 1H NMR spectroscopy absorb downfield of the TMS signal, thus there is usually no interference between the standard and the sample. Similarly, all four carbon atoms in a tetramethylsilane molecule are equivalent.
In a fully decoupled 13C NMR spectrum, the carbon in the tetramethylsilane appears as a singlet, allowing for easy identification. The chemical shift of this singlet is also set to be δ 0 in the 13C spectrum, and all other chemical shifts are determined relative to it.

References 

Carbosilanes
Trimethylsilyl compounds